There currently are 12 United States congressional districts in New Jersey based on results from the 2020 census. There were once as many as 15.

During the 114th Congress, Democrats held six seats, and Republicans held six seats, in New Jersey's delegation to the United States House of Representatives. The 115th Congress saw Democrats holding seven seats and Republicans holding five, with Democrat Josh Gottheimer defeating seven-term Republican incumbent Scott Garrett in New Jersey's 5th congressional district. During the 2018 federal midterm elections, Democratic candidates Tom Malinowski, Mikie Sherrill, Jeff Van Drew, and Andy Kim won an additional four seats for their party. This left Chris Smith in the 4th district as the only Republican member of New Jersey's congressional delegation for the 116th Congress. Van Drew, however, left the Democratic Party on December 19, 2019, to become a Republican. In November of 2022, Tom Malinowski lost re-election to Republican Thomas Kean Jr., reducing Democrats' majority in the delegation to 9-3.

Current districts and representatives
List of members of the United States House delegation from New Jersey, their terms, their district boundaries, and the district political ratings, according to the CPVI. The delegation has a total of 12 members, including 9 Democrats and 3 Republicans.

Historical district boundaries
Below is a table of United States congressional district boundary maps for the State of New Jersey, presented chronologically. All redistricting events that took place in New Jersey in the decades between 1973 and 2013 are shown.

Obsolete districts
13th district, obsolete since the 2010 census
14th district, obsolete since the 1990 census
15th district, obsolete since the 1980 census
At-large district, obsolete since 1843

See also

 United States congressional delegations from New Jersey
 List of United States congressional districts

References